Popularly called as the "Manchester of South India", the culture of Coimbatore is based on the culture of the Kongu Nadu region, the western part of Tamil Nadu. Distinctly different from that of any other city in India. Being a cosmopolitan city, the culture of the city reflects its diverse population which has resulted in a unique blend. Though it is generally considered a traditional city, Coimbatore is more diverse and cosmopolitan than other cities in Tamil Nadu. Traditional music, dance and all other art forms of Tamil Nadu are very popular in the city. One can find a unique blend of culture from traditional foods to fast foods, from ancient temple architecture to modern high-rises and from classical music and dance to the growing nightlife in the city. Coimbatore and its people have a reputation for entrepreneurship.

Music and arts
The city conducts its own music festival every year. Art, dance and music concerts are held annually during the months of September and December (Tamil calendar month – Margazhi). The heavy industrialisation of the city has also resulted in the growth of trade unions.

People
The city's population is predominantly Hindu, along with a small group of Muslim population.   Christians, Sikhs and Jains are also present in small numbers. Coimbatore also has a large number of Telugus, Kannadigas , Malayalis, mainly from Palakkad and North Indians, mainly Gujaratis, who are engaged in trade and commerce. During the 1970s the city witnessed a population explosion as a result of migration fuelled by increased economic growth and job opportunities.

Religion
There are numerous temples in and around the city including the Perur Temple, Koniamman Temple, Puliakulam Vinayagar Temple, Kottai Eshwaran Temple, Eachanari Vinayagar Temple, Thandu Mariamman Temple, Marudamalai Murugan Temple, Singanallur Aravan Temple, ISKCON Temple, Karamadai temple, Loga Nayaga Shani Eswaran shrine, Astamsa Varada Anjaneyar temple, Panchamuga Anjaneya temple and Dhyanalinga Yogic Temple. The Mariamman festivals, at the city's numerous Amman temples, are major events in summer. The mosques on Oppanakara Street and Big Bazaar Street date back to the period of Hyder Ali. Christian missions date back to 1647 when permission was granted by the Nayak rulers to set up a small church in Karumathampatti . It was destroyed by Tipu Sultan's army resulting in a new church in 1804. In 1886, Coimbatore was constituted as a diocese after bifurcating with Puducherry. Sikh Gurudwaras and Jain Temples are also present in Coimbatore. The Puliakulam Vinayagar Temple stands with the biggest lord Ganesha's statue in Asia.  Bethesda Prayer Centre is available at Karunya Nagar.

Cuisine

Coimbatore cuisine is predominantly south Indian with rice as its base. However, the population of Coimbatore is multi-cultural due to the influx of migrant population from various regions of the country. Most locals still retain their rural flavour, with many restaurants serving food over a banana leaf. North Indian, Chinese and continental cuisines are also available. Mysore pak (a sweet made from lentil flour and ghee), idly, dosa, Halwa (a sweet made of different ingredients like milk, wheat, rice). The Annapoorna Gowrishankar Hotels is a gem of this region known for its high quality vegetarian food and their Sambar ( The sambar for all its branches around Coimbatore are prepared in a single large batch and then delivered to the branches, thus the taste remains consistent). Biryani is also popular among the locals. Apart from this Coimbatore has a very active street food culture, thanks to the migratory North Indian population that settled down here a few generation ago, in fact a streetfood that is popular all over Tamil Nadu The Kaazhaan has its origins here in Coimbatore, it is usually prepared by simmering deep fried mushrooms( usually chopped mushroom) in a spicy broth, until it reaches a porridge like consistency and served sprinkled with chopped onions and coriander leaves.

Language
Kongu Tamil is the dialect of Tamil language that is spoken majorly in the city. It is originally known as "Kangee"`  or "Kongalam" or "Coimbatore Tamil" or  "Kongappechu" or 'Kongu Bashai'. The speciality of Kongu Tamil is the use of the alveolar ற – Tra/Dra (as in the English word track) instead of retroflex T/D (ட) of standard Tamil. For example, 'ennuDaya' (mine) of standard Tamil is pronounced enRa in the Kongu dialect. Additionally the use of guttural nasal (ங்) that sounds "ng" as in the English word Gang, is more prevalent in Kongu Tamil, leading to situations where the grammar of Kongu Tamil would not fit into the grammar of standard Tamil (as laid down in authoritative treatises like Tolkappiyam and Nannool). One of the examples is the use of ங் to end a word like வாங் "vaang", means 'come' expressed in a respectful tone, which in standard Tamil would be "vaanga". English is increasingly spoken by the educated class and other languages spoken in the city include Malayalam, Kannada, Telugu and Urdu.

Festivals
Coimbatore celebrates many festivals including local temple festivals such as :
Thai Pongal, celebrated in the month of January, is the most important festival of and is celebrated over a period of five days. Pongal has been designated the "State Festival" for its unique celebration that is typical of Tamil Nadu
Tamil New Year signifying the beginning of the Tamil calendar usually falls in April and is celebrated widely with special poojas in temples
Being a cosmopolitan city, almost all major festivals like Deepavali, Eid and Christmas are celebrated here
Onam is also celebrated with much fanfare due to a considerable Malayali immigrant population
Koniamman Temple car festival is celebrated in the month of March each year
Perur Temple car festival is celebrated in the month of March each year
Perur Temple Seedling Planting festival is celebrated each year in the month of June
Vinayagar Chathurthi is celebrated in major temples such as Puliakulam Vinayagar Temple and Eachanari Vinayagar Temple
Aravan Festival is celebrated as a "Community Reconciliation Festival" in Coimbatore in various places such as Vellalore, Thudiyalur, Kurichi, Singanallur, Annur, Vadavalli and Kattampatti

References

Coimbatore
Indian culture by community
Tamil culture